Suehiro Ishikawa (born September 27, 1979) is a Japanese long-distance runner. He finished 47th in the senior men's race at the 2009 IAAF World Cross Country Championships. He placed seventh at the 2013 Berlin Marathon and fourth at the 2016 Lake Biwa Marathon, qualifying for the 2016 Olympics.

Ishikawa has a degree in economics from the Toyo University.

References

Living people
1979 births
Japanese male long-distance runners
Japanese male marathon runners
Athletes (track and field) at the 2016 Summer Olympics
Olympic athletes of Japan
20th-century Japanese people
21st-century Japanese people